Uthama Puthiran may refer to:

 Uthama Puthiran (1940 film), a 1940 Tamil language film starring P. U. Chinnappa
 Uthama Puthiran (1958 film), a 1958 Tamil language film starring Sivaji Ganesan
 Uthamaputhiran (2010 film), a 2010 Tamil language film starring Dhanush and Genelia D'Souza